Gotta Have It may refer to:

"Gotta Have It", the commercial campaign slogan of Pepsi in 1991-92
"Gotta Have It", song by French singer Vanessa Paradis on her 1994 album Live
"Karaoke Cafe: 'Gotta Have It'", 1994 episode of American claymation series Bump in the Night
"Gotta Have It", 2004 solo single by American rapper Beanie Sigel 

Gotta Have It, 2004 romance novel by American author Lori Wilde
"Gotta Have It" (song), 2011 song by American hip hop artists Kanye West and Jay-Z

See also
She's Gotta Have It, a 1986 Spike Lee film